The Terrier Malemute is a two-stage American sounding rocket typically used for smaller payloads (less than ). Both the Terrier first stage and the Malemute second stage use solid fuel. The Terrier burns for approximately 5.2 seconds, and the Malemute burns for approximately 21.5 seconds. The first stage booster consists of a surplus Navy Terrier MK 12 Mod 1 rocket motor with four  fin panels arranged in a cruciform configuration. The second stage solid rocket is a Thiokol Malemute TU-758 rocket motor, specially designed for high altitude research rocket applications. Its first flight was on November 11, 1974, from Barking Sands. Other launch sites have included Poker Flat, Wallops Island and Fort Yukon, Alaska.

The Terrier Improved Malemute uses a Terrier Mk. 70 rocket motor for the first stage and a surplus MIM-104 Patriot motor (Thiokol TX-486-1) for the second stage. The Terrier Improved Malemute has made two successful test flights and two failed attempts. Two of these rockets were successfully used in 2012 in the Anomalous Transport Rocket Experiment (ATREX) upper atmospheric study.

On 26 November 2019, a Terrier Improved Malemute suborbital sounding rocket was launched from Ny-Ålesund, Norway. The rocket conducted the ICI-5 mission for NASA and Norwegian research institutes. The purpose of the mission was ionosphere research.

See also 
 Terrier Oriole
 Terrier Orion

References

External links 
 

Sounding rockets of the United States